St. Mary's Orthodox Cathedral, Hauz Khas, New Delhi, is a parish under the Delhi Diocese of the Malankara Orthodox Syrian Church.

History
St. Mary's Orthodox Cathedral is the first place of worship for the Malankara Orthodox Syrian Church in Delhi. The beginning of the parish was in 1942 by forming a congregation by father Mathews, later Baselios Mar Thoma Mathews II. The parish was constituted in 1952 and the first vicar was father K C Thomas who later became Thomas Mar Makarios. When the parish created, it was under the Diocese of Outside Kerala with Alexios Mar Theodosios as its Metropolitan. When Delhi Diocese was formed in 1975, St. Mary's Orthodox Church was the principal church of the diocese and functioned as the Diocesan Headquarters. When the Delhi Orthodox Centre started in 1984, the Diocesan Headquarters was shifted to the Delhi Orthodox Centre.

The parish celebrated the Golden Jubilee of the setting up of the Delhi parish recently.

Cathedral
The parish was declared as the St. Mary's Orthodox Cathedral in 1979.

The ‘mother parish’ has helped in and witnessed the growth of several parishes in and around Delhi during the last five decades. These are : Mar Gregorios Orthodox Church Janakpuri, St. James' Orthodox Church, Mayur Vihar Phase-3, Delhi, St. Mary's Orthodox Church, Faridabad, St. John's Orthodox Church, Mayur Vihar, St. Thomas Orthodox Church, Sarita Vihar, St. Thomas Orthodox Church, Ghaziabad, St. Basil Orthodox Church, Rohini, St. George's Orthodox Church, Dwaraka, St. Stephen's Orthodox Church, Dilshad Garden, Mar Gregorios Orthodox Church, Noida, and Mar Gregorios Orthodox Church, Dharuhera.

The Cathedral has set up a Chapel in St. Paul's School and built St. George Chapel in St. Mary's Medical Centre in Aya Nagar.

St. Paul’s School
While the church building was under the final stage of construction, in 1967 itself a payment of Rs.10,141.53 was made to the DDA towards premium for the allotment of a plot of land for the school admeasuring 9817 square yards, in which the foundation stone of the school was laid on 28 April 1968 by Mathews Mar Athanasios, the Metropolitan. In acknowledgement of a donation of Rs.10,000 from the estate of the late Fr. V.C. George, the school was declared as being run in his memory. 
The setting up of the school was in fulfilment of the second objective of the Society, after the place of worship was built.
St. Paul's School, inaugurated in July 1968, has grown into a full-fledged Senior Secondary School for all students regardless of caste, creed or financial status or other extraneous considerations.

St. Mary’s Medical Centre
A major step towards the fulfillment of the third objective, of setting up a health care facility, by the Society, was taken in 2001.  On 22 April 2001, the foundation stone for a chapel, forming part of the medical centre, was laid by Job Mar Philoxenos, acting Metropolitan of Delhi Diocese, on a plot of land admeasuring 1500 square yards, and costing Rs. 24.51 lakhs, in Aya Nagar. Within a year, on 25 April 2002, this Chapel, named after St. George,  was consecrated by Job Mar Philoxenos. The work on the portion pertaining to the first phase of the medical centre was inaugurated by the Chief Minister of Delhi, Smt. Sheila Dikshit, on 18 August 2002.

Notes

External links
 Website of St. Mary's Orthodox Cathedral, Delhi
 Website of Malankara Orthodox Syrian Church
 Malankara Sabha History

Cathedrals in New Delhi
Churches in Delhi
Malankara Orthodox Syrian cathedrals
20th-century churches in India
20th-century Oriental Orthodox church buildings